Wild as the Wind may refer to:

 Wild as the Wind, an album by Patricia Conroy
 "Wild as the Wind", a song by Garth Brooks from the album Double Live